The Fokker F.XVIII was an airliner produced in the Netherlands in the early 1930s, essentially a scaled-up version of the Fokker F.XII intended for long-distance flights. Like its predecessor, it was a conventional high-wing cantilever monoplane with fixed tailwheel undercarriage. Its cabin could seat 12 passengers, or four-to-six on seats convertible to sleeping berths. Only five were built, all for KLM, and registered as PH-AIO, 'AIP, 'AIQ, 'AIR and 'AIS, all of which were named after birds. Used by KLM on its Amsterdam-Batavia route, the F.XVIII became celebrated in the Netherlands due to two especially noteworthy flights. In December 1933, one aircraft (registration PH-AIP, Pelikaan - "Pelican") was used to make a special Christmas mail flight to Batavia, completing the round trip in a flight time of 73 hours 34 minutes. The following Christmas, another F.XVIII (registration PH-AIS, Snip - "Snipe") made a similar flight to Curaçao in 55 hours 58 minutes after having been specially re-engined for the journey.

In October 1936, the F.XVIIIs were withdrawn from the service to Batavia, replaced by the Douglas DC-2. KLM sold PH-AIQ and PH-AIR to Československá Letecká Společnost where they were re-registered as OK-AIQ and OK-AIR. They used them on their Prague-Vienna-Berlin route until 1938. 'AIQ then went to Commercial Aviation Corporation at Lydda, Palestine (now Ben Gurion Airport) in December 1938 where it became VQ-PAF, crashing there on 13 January 1939. The wreck remained on the airfield until 1948 when it was taken on charge by the Israeli Air Force but never re-built and it was subsequently scrapped in Israel. OK-AIR was taken on-charge by Deutsche Lufthansa in 1938 as D-AAIR. Its fate is unrecorded - probably pressed into Luftwaffe service and destroyed during WW2. PH-AIP Pelikaan went to Air Tropique, a front for the Spanish Republican government which used it as a transport during the Spanish Civil War. It was transferred onto the French register as F-APIP and was subsequently destroyed by a bombing raid at Vilajuiga, Spain on 6 February 1939. The two remaining aircraft were transferred to KLMWIB (Koninklijke Luchtvaart Maatschappij West-Indisch Bedrijf -  KLM's West Indies Division) at Willemstad, Curaçao for regional services in the Caribbean. One of these was PH-AIS Snip, later PJ-AIS, the other was PH-AIO, later PJ-AIO, originally named Oehoe ("Owl"), but renamed Oriol ("Oriole") since the Owl was regarded as unlucky in the local culture. These aircraft served on routes between Curaçao and Venezuela, Dutch Guiana (now Suriname), Columbia  and Trinidad as well as inter-island services to Aruba, Bonaire and Saint Maarten. Routes to Jamaica opened in 1941, and Cuba and Miami in 1942.

PJ-AIO was leased to the Netherlands West Indies colonial government in June 1940 and converted by KLM engineers into a maritime patrol aircraft for use by the Netherlands West Indies Defence Force. A single .303 Lewis machine gun was fitted on a flexible mount firing from an open dorsal position. The passenger cabin was stripped out and a bomb-bay installed consisting of racks to hold an unspecified number of improvised 8 kg (80mm) anti-submarine bombs aimed and dropped by hand from an open bombardier's hatch in the bomb bay floor. The aircraft was given a coat of camouflage paint and orange Dutch national markings were applied. No military serial was allocated. The machine was employed on anti-submarine patrol duties from both Oranjestad, Aruba and Hato, Curaçao from 1940 until 1942 when it was returned to KLM civil use, the anti-submarine patrols being taken over by US aircraft.

PJ-AIO and PJ-AIS remained in service with KLMWIB until 1946 when 'AIO was broken-up at Curaçao. PJ-AIS remained derelict at Willemstad until restored as a museum-piece in the 1970s. The forward fuselage section of Snip is now preserved at the Curaçao Museum.

Operators
 KLM (5 aircraft. PH-AIO, 'AIP, 'AIQ, 'AIR, and 'AIS)
 Československá Letecká Společnost (2 aircraft ex-KLM, OK-AIQ and 'AIR)
 Commercial Aviation Corporation, Lydda, (now Lod) Palestine (1 aircraft ex-ČSA, VQ-PAF)
 Israeli Air Force, (1 aircraft, ex-Commercial Aviation Corp. VQ-PAF)
 Deutsche Lufthansa (1 aircraft ex-ČSA, D-AAIR)
 Spanish Republican Air Force (1 aircraft ex-KLM, F-APIP)
 KLM West-Indisch Bedrijf (KLM West Indies Division) (2 aircraft ex-KLM, PJ-AIO and 'AIS)
Netherlands West Indies Defence Force (1 aircraft leased from KLM, PJ-AIO)

Specifications (Snip)

References

Bibliography

Further reading

External links

 Snip at the Curaçao Museum website
 De Vlucht van de Snip

1930s Dutch airliners
F 18
Aircraft first flown in 1932
High-wing aircraft
Trimotors